A border barrier, border fence or border wall is a separation barrier that runs along or near an international border. Such barriers are typically constructed for border control purposes such as curbing illegal immigration, human trafficking, and smuggling. Some such barriers are constructed for defence or security reasons. In cases of a disputed or unclear border, erecting a barrier can serve as a de facto unilateral consolidation of a territorial claim that can supersede formal delimitation. A border barrier does not usually indicate the location of the actual border, and is usually constructed unilaterally by a country, without the agreement or cooperation of the other country.

Examples of border walls include the ancient Great Wall of China, a series of walls separating China from nomadic empires to the north. The construction of border barriers increased in the early 2000s; half of all the border barriers built since World War II which ended in 1945, were built after 2000.

List of current barriers

Note: The table can be sorted alphabetically or chronologically using the  icon.

Border barriers in history

Antiquity
Antonine Wall (began in AD 142 by the Roman province in Britain)
Anastasian Wall (built from AD 469, west of Istanbul, Turkey)
 Great Wall of China (parts were built as early as the 7th century BC by the Qi dynasty in China)
Great Wall of Gorgan (built in 5th or 6th century AD)
Hadrian's Wall (begun in AD 122)
Madukkarai Wall (may have been built as early as the 1st century AD in India)
 Southern Great Wall, southern counterpart wall to the Great Wall, erected to protect and divide the Chinese from the  "southern barbarians" called Miao (meaning barbaric and nomadic)

Middle Ages
Cheolli Jangseong
The fortifications, castles and border walls between the Emirate of Granada and the Crown of Castile, later Spain between 1238 and 2 January 1492 although it continued as the internal border of the Crown of Castile, then Spain as Kingdom of Granada from 2 January 1492 to 29 September 1833. A large part of the fortifications, castles and walls is currently in good condition.
Asilah: The King Alfonso V of Portugal built walls on the outskirts of the city of Asilah, serving as a border between the Kingdom of Portugal and the Marinid dynasty (1471–1472), the Saadi Sultanate (1472–1550), the Wattasid dynasty (1577–1589), in the area of the sea there are still cannons next to a Portuguese square tower. Currently the Wall is in good condition.
Macau: Ming dynasty (currently China) built a wall around Macau in 1570.

Early modern period
Great Hedge of India, built by the British in 1803
The border forts between the Captaincy General of Chile later Chile and the Mapuche territory that served as the border between the two from 1598 to 1883, which was delimited mainly by the Biobío river, the route passed through the Province of Biobío, Region of Biobío and the Region of Araucanía.
Zanja de Alsina, built in the 1870s along the southern frontier of Argentina
The points, forts and border barriers that functioned between the French Conchinchina and the Nguyễn dynasty that functioned between 1862 and 1887.

Defunct barriers in modern times
The posts and barriers between Kiautschou Bay Leased Territory and Qing dynasty later China between 1898 and 1914 and later served as the border between the Empire of Japan and the China, that worked between November 7, 1914, and December 10, 1922, and reoccupied in the Second Sino-Japanese War from 1937 and 1945.
The posts and border barriers between Leased Territory of Guangzhouwan and Qing dynasty later China that worked between 1898 and 1945.
The Czechoslovak border fortifications and fortified defensive lines built between 1935 and 1938 as a defensive countermeasure against the rising threat of Nazi Germany.
The Maginot Line, built between 1929 and 1938 by France on the French–German border as a defensive structure.
The border posts and barriers between the (Empire of Japan) through the (Karafuto Prefecture) and the (Russian Empire after Russian SSR after USSR) through the Sakhalin Oblast that operated between 5 September 1907 and 25 August 1945.
The border posts, forts and walls between the Russian Dalian (Russian Empire) and the Qing dynasty between 27 March 1898 – 5 September 1905 and between the Kwantung Leased Territory (Empire of Japan) and the (Qing dynasty 5 September 1905 – 10 October 1911 and the Republic of China 10 October 1911 – 1932), later Manchukuo (1932 – 14 August 1945) later by the USSR as the Soviet occupation of Manchuria between August 14, 1945, and May 3, 1946, when it was returned to the Republic of China.
The posts, forts and border barriers that operated between the British Burma (1824–1858, 1947–1948) later British Raj through the province of British Burma and French Indochina, Kingdom of Siam and Qing dynasty later China).
The frontier posts, forts and barriers that operated between the colony and overseas territory of the French India and (Mughal Empire after Maratha Empire after Company Rule in India after British Raj after India) which operated between 1664 and 1 November 1954.
The posts, forts and border barriers between Finland and the former Soviet Union, in the Hanko peninsula (1940–1941) and in the Porkkala peninsula (1945–1956).
The frontier posts, forts and barriers that operated between the colony and overseas province of the Portuguese India and (Mughal Empire after Bijapur Sultanate after Maratha Empire after Company Rule in India after British Raj after India) which functioned between 15 August 1505 and 19 December 1961.
The coastal posts, forts and walls that were in Dutch New Guinea (27 December 1949 – 1 October 1962) after United Nations Provisional Executive Authority (1 October 1962 – 1 May 1963) and served to ward off the United States of Indonesia (27 December 1949 – 17 August 1950) and after Indonesia (17 August 1950 – 1 May 1963).
The frontier posts, forts and barriers that operated between the colony and overseas province of the Portuguese Timor, (Independent East Timor between November 1975 to December 7, 1975) and (Dutch East Indies (15 August 1702 – 27 December 1949) later United States of Indonesia (27 December 1949 – 17 August 1950) later Indonesia (17 August 1950 – 7 December 1975) which functioned between 15 August 1702 and 7 December 1975, the border continues to function but is currently free passage.
The border posts, forts and barriers between the (Panama Canal Zone) United States and Panama in operation between November 18, 1903, until October 1, 1979, partially and totally the July 1, 1999.
The former Soviet Union had a security barrier (see С-175 "curtain") along its entire border from Norway and Finland to North Korea and China. The barrier also existed along to direct border to Soviet allies, e.g. Poland. Along the Finnish border, the barrier was not so well guarded however since Finland agreed to send back all Soviet citizens who escaped. The fence was located a few kilometers (miles) from the border, and still partly remains. Russian law still forbids crossing the border outside of a border station.
Iron Curtain in Europe and Asia: apart from the direct border between the former Soviet Union and Norway/Finland, this former barrier includes:
 Berlin Wall
 Inner German border
 Vietnamese Demilitarized Zone
 German–Czech Border
 Inner Yemen border

Other
 Danevirke
 Gates of Alexander
 Götavirke
 Limes Germanicus
 Limes Saxoniae
 Offa's Dyke
 Willow Palisade
 Zasechnaya cherta

See also
 Buffer zone
 Canada–United States border
 Canal
 Defense line
 Peace lines
 Demilitarised zone
 Defensive walls
 List of cities with defensive walls
 List of fortifications
 List of walls
 Trump wall
 Fences in Rio de Janeiro

References

External links and further reading

 
Borders
Fences
Fortifications by type
Types of wall
Divided regions
Human migration
Physical security
Political geography